The 2019 Penn State Nittany Lions men's soccer team represented Pennsylvania State University during the 2019 NCAA Division I men's soccer season and the 2019 Big Ten Conference men's soccer season. The regular season began on August 30 and concluded on November 3. It was the program's 107th season fielding a men's varsity soccer team, and their 29th season in the Big Ten Conference. The 2019 season is Jeff Cook's second year at the helm.

Background 

The 2018 season was the Nittany Lions' 106th season as a varsity soccer program, and their 28th season playing in the Big Ten Conference. The team was led by first year head coach, Jeff Cook, who had previously served as an assistant coach for the professional soccer team, Bethlehem Steel of USL Championship.

Player movement

Departures

Arrivals

Transfers

Preseason

Preseason Big Ten poll
Penn State was predicted to finish 6th in the Big Ten Conference.

Squad

Roster

Team management 
{|class="wikitable"
|-
! style="" scope="col" colspan="2"|Front office
|-

|-
! style="" scope="col" colspan="2"|Coaching staff
|-

Schedule 

|-
!colspan=8 style=""| Preseason
|-

|-
!colspan=8 style=""| Regular season
|-

|-
!colspan=6 style=""| Big Ten Tournament
|-

|-
!colspan=6 style=""| NCAA Tournament
|-

Rankings

2020 MLS SuperDraft

References

External links 
 PSU Soccer Schedule

2019
Penn State Nittany Lions
Penn State Nittany Lions
Penn State Nittany Lions men's soccer
Penn State Nittany Lions